Single Dad in Love is a 2008 South Korean television series starring Oh Ji-ho, Huh E-jae and Kang Sung-yeon. It aired on KBS2 from February 18 to April 8, 2008 on Mondays and Tuesdays at 21:55 for 16 episodes.

Plot
Kang Poong-ho is a pest exterminator by day and a K-1/mixed martial arts fighter by night. He is a single father raising his 7-year-old son Kang San after the boy's mother, his first love Yoon So-yi, abandoned them to pursue her ambition of becoming a pianist. Despite life's trials, Poong-ho never loses his optimism and sense of humor.

He meets and falls in love with Jeon Ha-ri, a bright and bubbly medical student from a wealthy family. An obstacle to their romance arises when they learn that Ha-ri's soon-to-be stepmother is none other So-yi and that it was Ha-ri's surgeon father Jeon Ki-suk who sponsored her piano studies abroad. As So-yi re-enters their lives, San is diagnosed with a brain tumor. Poong-ho is willing to go to any lengths to save his beloved son.

Cast

Main characters
Oh Ji-ho as Kang Poong-ho
Heo Yi-jae as Jeon Ha-ri
Kang Sung-yeon as Yoon So-yi
 as Jeon Ki-suk
Ahn Do-gyu as Kang San

Supporting characters
Im Joo-hwan as Min Hyun-ki
Shindong as Oh Chil-goo
Kim Ha-eun as Jo Kyung-ah, Ha-ri's friend
 as Goo Sang-tae, Poong-ho's boxing coach
Min Wook 민욱 as Min Joon-ho, principal
Kim Ja-ok as Jung Eun-ji, Hyun-ki' mother 
Jang Ji-min as Park Min-joo
Jung Jae-soon as Lee Wal-soon, Min-joo's grandmother

References

External links
Single Dad in Love official KBS website 

Seoul Broadcasting System television dramas
2008 South Korean television series debuts
2008 South Korean television series endings
Korean-language television shows
South Korean romance television series
South Korean melodrama television series